Joseph Twomey (born 1931) is an Irish retired hurler who played as a midfielder for the Cork senior team.

Born in Blackpool, Cork, Twomey was introduced to hurling in his youth. He developed his skills at the North Monastery, however, his tenure at the school coincided with a fallow period in terms of success. Twomey came to prominence at underage levels with Glen Rovers before making his senior debut in 1950. He won six championship medals over a decade-long club career.

Twomey made his debut on the inter-county scene when he first linked up with the Cork senior team for the 1952 championship. He went on to play a key role at midfield during a hugely successful era for Cork, and won two All-Ireland medals, two Munster medals and one National Hurling League medal.

Throughout his career Twomey made 10 championship appearances. He retired from inter-county hurling following the conclusion of 1960 championship.

Playing career

Club

Twomey was added to the Glen Rovers senior panel in 1950 as the club were attempting to secure a third successive championship. Southside rivals St. Finbarr's were the opponents in the final and mounted attack after attack on the Glen goal but failed to raise the green flag. The Glen backs gave one of the finest displays of defensive hurling ever seen in the championship and kept the southsiders tally for the first half to 0-4. "The Barr's" added just one further point to their tally after the interval. The 2-8 to 0-5 victory secured a third successive championship title for the club and a first winners' medal for Twomey who was introduced as a substitute.

Sarsfields ended the Glen's hopes of four-in-a-row in 1951, while defeat in the first round of 1952 looked like heralding a fallow period. The club returned stronger than ever when they qualified for the 1953 championship final where they faced Sarsfields once again. After a slow start Glen Rovers gave an exhibition of hurling all over the field. The 8-5 to 4-3 victory secured a second championship medal for Twomey.

In 1954 Glen Rovers reached their 17th championship final in twenty years. Blackrock fielded a young team, however, Glen Rovers had eight inter-county players on their team. In spite of this, Blackrock stood up to the champions and the result remained in doubt to the end. A 3-7 to 3-2 victory secured a third championship medal for Twomey.

Glen Rovers lost the next two championship deciders, while Twomey was ruled out of the Glen's 1958 championship triumph after being sent off in the semi-final. In spite of watching the game from the stands he still collected a fourth championship medal having played in the earlier rounds. He was back on the starting fifteen as Glen Rovers faced Blackrock in the 1959 championship final. Once again the game went to the wire and it was Christy Ring who scored the winning goal with four minutes remaining. His tally of 1-6 was vital in securing the 3-11 to 3-5 victory and a fifth championship medal for Twomey.

Twomey was appointed captain in 1960 as a third successive championship beckoned. University College Cork were the opponents in the championship decider. The game was regarded as one of the most thrill-packed and nerve-shattering games in the history of the championship. With time running out the Glen were behind, however, Christy Ring pointed a free from the sideline to level the game. Johnny Clifford secured the lead when his sideline cut went straight over the bar. He gave the Glen a two-point lead straight from the puck-out when his shot sailed over the bar again. The 3-8 to 1-12 victory gave Twomey his sixth championship medal, while he also had the honour of lifting the Seán Óg Murphy Cup.

Inter-county

Twomey made his senior championship debut on 22 June 1952 in a 6-6 to 2-4 Munster semi-final defeat of Limerick. This victory qualified Cork for a Munster final showdown with four-in-a-row hopefuls Tipperary. Trailing by 2-5 to 0-5 at the break, Liam Dowling scored a vital second-half goal to leave Cork just a point in arrears. Cork held out for the lead and won the game by 1-11 to 2-6. It was Twomey's first Munster medal. For the first time in eight years, Cork subsequently faced Dublin in the All-Ireland final on 7 September 1952. The Munster champions took a narrow 1-5 to 0-5 half-time lead after a Liam Dowling goal, however, Cork took complete control after the interval, with Dowling netting a second goal. A 2-14 to 0-7 victory gave Twomey his first All-Ireland medal.

Cork and Tipperary renewed their rivalry in 1953, when a record crowd of over 38,000 saw them contest the final of the league. Paddy Barry and Jimmy Lynam gave Cork a comfortable lead after scoring two goals as Tipperary missed several scoring chances. Paddy Kennedy responded with two goals at the end to narrow Cork's margin of victory to 2-10 to 2-7, with Twomey collecting a National Hurling League medal. Having already met in the league decider, Cork and Tipperary qualified to meet in the Munster final as well. Tipperary were now a team in decline, and Twomey collected a second successive Munster medal after a 3-10 to 1-11 victory. This victory qualified Cork for the All-Ireland final against Galway. After a slow start, which allowed Galway take an early lead, Cork regrouped and were 2-1 to 0-3 ahead at half-time after goals from Josie Hartnett and Christy Ring. Galway remained close to Cork throughout the second half, however, a third goal from Tom O'Sullivan put the result beyond doubt and secured a 3-3 to 0-8 victory for Cork. It was Twomey's second All-Ireland medal.

Twomey was dropped from the Cork team for the 1954 championship campaign, however, he returned at midfield the following year. Twomey played in Cork's opening championship campaign in 1956 before being dropped from the panel once again. He remained on and off the panel over the next few years before being appointed captain in 1960 as Cork faced Tipperary in the Munster final. Described as the toughest game of hurling ever played, Cork enjoyed most of the possession in the first half, however, Tipperary led by a goal at the interval thanks to the accuracy of Jimmy Doyle. They stretched their lead to five points in the final quarter, however, a last-minute Cork goal left the result in doubt once again. Tipperary eventually won a gruelling contest by 4-13 to 4-11.

Honours

Glen Rovers
Cork Senior Hurling Championship (6): 1950, 1953, 1954, 1958 (sub), 1959, 1960 (c)

Cork
All-Ireland Senior Hurling Championship (2): 1952, 1953
Munster Senior Hurling Championship (2): 1952, 1953
National Hurling League (1): 1952-53

References

1931 births
Glen Rovers hurlers
Cork inter-county hurlers
All-Ireland Senior Hurling Championship winners
Living people